2-haloalkanoic acid dehalogenase may refer to:
 2-haloacid dehalogenase (configuration-inverting), an enzyme
 2-haloacid dehalogenase (configuration-retaining), an enzyme